Right or Wrong is the second studio album by American country music singer Rosanne Cash. It was released in September 1979 by Columbia Records. 

The three highest charting Billboard country tracks were "Couldn't Do Nothin' Right" at #15, "No Memories Hangin' 'Round", a duet with Bobby Bare, at #17, and "Take Me, Take Me" at #25. The album peaked at No. 42 on the Billboard Top Country Albums chart.

Critical reception
AllMusic wrote that Rodney Crowell and Cash "made the song selections while Rodney called in Emmylou Harris's band (of which he was an alumnus) and some up and comers and created a sonic palette that accented the brave new world of stripped-down mixes and songs that came from the left field of country or pop." Pitchfork wrote that Right or Wrong "kicked off a decade of untouchable albums." Orange Coast praised the "smooth, satisfying vocal performance."

Track listing

Personnel
Rosanne Cash - Vocals, Acoustic Guitar
Rodney Crowell - Acoustic Guitar, Harmony Vocals
Emmylou Harris - Harmony Vocals
Bobby Bare - Vocals
Hal Blaine - Drums
James Burton - Electric Guitar
Ricky Skaggs - Acoustic Guitar, Mandolin, Fiddle
Jim Horn - Flute, Saxophone
Albert Lee - Guitar
Mickey Raphael - Harmonica
Brian Ahern - Acoustic Guitar
Tony Brown - Piano
Rosemary Butler - Harmony Vocals
Donivan Cowert - Harmony Vocals
Hank DeVito - Acoustic Guitar, Slide Guitar
Emory Gordy Jr. - Bass, Organ, String Arrangements
Glen Hardin - Electric Piano
Sharon Hicks - Vocals
Frank Reckard - Electric Guitar
Aldo Strucci - Electric Guitar
John Ware - Drums
Cheryl Warren - Vocals
Larry Willoughby - Harmony Vocals

References 

1979 albums
Rosanne Cash albums
Albums produced by Rodney Crowell
Columbia Records albums